is a 2015 Japanese animated action fantasy film based on Pretty Cure franchise created by Izumi Todo, and its twelfth series, Go! Princess PreCure. The film is divided into three segments: Cure Flora and the Mischievous Mirror, Pumpkin Kingdom's Treasure and Leff's Wonder Night!. Each segments are directed by Yukio Kaizawa, Akifumi Zako, and Hiroshi Miyamoto respectively, and produced by Toei Animation. The film was released in Japanese theaters on October 31, 2015.

The catchcopy of the film is

Plot

Cure Flora and the Mischievous Mirror
Cure Flora comes in a room, admiring her flower tiara but later comes across a mirror where a group of ghosts try to play a prank on her by copying her appearance. During their battle, Flora ends up breaking her tiara, so the ghosts decide to replace it by transforming into a pumpkin dress.

The Pumpkin Kingdom's Treasure
After fighting a Parfait Zetsuborg that suddenly appeared, Haruka and the others are suddenly transported to the Pumpkin Kingdom, where a Princess Convention is being held to determine who will become the kingdom's new princess. As the girls participate in various contests, Towa suspects something is amiss, prompting Haruka, Pafu, and Aroma to follow a trio of fairies to the kingdom's true princess, Pumplulu, who is being held captive. Hearing that the kingdom's minister, Warp, had locked Pumplulu up and caused her parents to forget about her, Haruka decides to help her out, learning that the citizens are being forced to make pudding nonstop. As Warp traps the other girls after they win their respective contests, Haruka makes her family's special pudding for the king and queen, restoring their memories of Pumplulu. Warp then traps the Cures in crystals, revealing he had targeted the kingdom purely to capture them. However, Haruka manages to break everyone free while the fairies work to rescue their trapped friends. As Warp transforms into his true form and starts absorbing the kingdom's citizens, Pumplulu unites the dreams of her citizens and the power of the Miracle Princess Lights to give birth to the Halloween Dress Up Keys, giving the Cures the power to defeat Warp and restore peace to the Pumpkin Kingdom. As thanks, Pumplulu invites the girls to participate in a special ball.

Leff's Wonder Night!
One day, a doll on Haruka's desk named Leff comes to life and takes Haruka and the other Cures to ask for their help in stopping Night Pumpkin, who plunged her kingdom into darkness. While Leff distracts the Zetsuborg guards with her singing, the Cures make their way to the top of a castle, where they must place the Miracle Princess Light to restore light to the kingdom. After learning that Leff is the kingdom's princess, the Cures soon come up against Night Pumpkin, who overwhelms them and takes the Miracle Light. However, Haruka and Leff remain determined and get the light back, allowing Leff to reach the top and restore the Kingdom's light.

Characters

Go! Princess PreCure 

 Haruka Haruno / Cure Flora (Yū Shimamura)
 Minami Kaido / Cure Mermaid (Masumi Asano)
 Kirara Amanogawa / Cure Twinkle (Hibiku Yamamura)
 Towa Akagi / Cure Scarlet (Miyuki Sawashiro)
 Pafu (Nao Tōyama)
 Aroma (Shiho Kokido)
 Yui Nanase (Haruka Yoshimura)
 Miss Shamour (Mayumi Shintani)
 Zetsuborg (Takayuki Nakatsukasa)

Kuroro makes a non-speaking appearance at the end of Treasure, while Haruka's family makes a non-speaking appearance in Haruka's flashback.

The Pumpkin Kingdom's Treasure 

A clean and friendly character, she cherishes the memories of making pudding with her parents. She was trapped on top of the tower by Warp, but she was rescued and reunited with her parents. While bidding farewell to the Cures, she gives the  her mother gave her. She was based on actress Suzu Hirose
Before being brainwashed by Warp, the King was a researcher of pumpkin varieties and the Queen was a sewer who made clothes for the fairies and made the Leff doll for her daughter.
Due to a lack of speech capabilities, they try to convey emotions with gestures. By being with Pumplulu, they escape Warp's brainwashing and acts to save her. Kaori Yamagata, who wrote the screenplay, stated that the fairies were inspired by the owarai trio .
Originally a member of Dys Dark, he left after continuing dissatisfaction with his inability to justify his own ability; therefore he looks down on Dyspear. He locks Pumplulu and manipulates her parents to make them forget about her. He plans to capture the Cures as his collection and afterwards, reveals his intention and assumes his Jackson's chameleon form and overpower the Cures. With Pumplulu's encouragement, they manage to defeat him with Halloween Eclair. His appearance was inspired by the Kamen Rider Kabuto protagonist actor Hiro Mizushima.

Leff's Wonder Night! 
She was originally a handmade doll of Pumplulu, whose room she was left in after her disappearance.
At the same time the night light was taken away by Night Pumpkin, he is a prisoner with the husband's king. She was held prisoner around the same time Night Pumpkin stole the daylight alongside her husband, .
He invaded Night Kingdom to turn the sky into night. The Cures distract him so they can allow Leff to place the Miracle Light on top of his palace and banish into darkness.

Production 

The film is split into three-parts: a 50-minute 2D film ; a 20-minutes CGI film ; and a 5-minute CGI short film .

About this screening form, Takashi Washio, who was in charge of planning the film, said:

Washio described his concept as:

According to this configuration, the three-part film was to be screened in 75 minutes. Washio described the reason of making the feature-length fifty-minutes long:

Puff and Aroma were in charge of explaining the Miracle Light, though explanations and warnings are omitted. A paper sun-visor "Princess Tiara" was also distributed.

An exhibition for the film was held at the 28th Tokyo International Film Festival, and the world premiere screening was held there on October 24. In addition, on October 22, an opening red carpet in Roppongi Hills where Pretty Cure kigurumi, the four Pretty Cure seiyu, and Every Little Thing participated, and a red carpet-walk at “Shinjuku Art Heaven 2015” on October 24 featured a Cure Flora kigurumi, the four Pretty Cure seiyu, and three of the directors.

Due to the film's success, an all-night screening of the five last fall Pretty Cure films was held on November 13 for adults fans aged 18 and over at Shinjuku WALD 9. At the same event, a talk show was held with the guests being the three directors, Washio, assistant producer Risa Nikaidō, and series producer Yū Kamiki. Also on October 27, Karin Isobe, Rie Kitagawa, and Shōko Ōmori were talk show guests.

This was the final work recorded in the old studio of Tavac in Shinjuku before the franchise's move to Toei Digital Center in Higashiōizumi, Nerima, Tokyo; Yu Shimamura said:

Cure Flora and the Mischievous Mirror

The CG short film “Cure Flora and the Mischievous Mirror” is a story centered on Cure Flora who becomes a super deformed character, and is the first attempt in Pretty Cure of a short story without dialogue. Washio said:

The film's director is veteran director Yukio Kaizawa. Kanako Miyamoto was the motion-capture actor of SD Cure Flora. Washio said that the reason for hiring Miyamoto was:

The Pumpkin Kingdom's Treasure
The cell-based feature length second part, The Pumpkin Kingdom's Treasure, is an ōdō-like story where the Cures have an isekai adventure.

It was directed by Akifumi Zako; Washio said of him:

The scriptwriter is Kaori Yamagata, who is credited under the pen name .

Kana Hanazawa, who voices the film-only character Princess Pumplulu, said: 

The theme song for the second part, Kira Kira, was written by Every Little Thing. Member Kaori Mochida said:

Washio said:

It was also announced that Hanazawa and Uegaki (described in the next section) will sing their songs in their respective part.

The film-only enhancement mode for this film, is given to all four cures instead of, as for the films of between Suite and HappinessCharge, the main cure.

Leff's Wonder Night!
Pretty Cure and Leff's Wonder Night! is an action work with a story expressed in CG as mentioned above. Director and character design were handled by Hiroshi Miyamoto. Washio said that:

According to Miyamoto, this work was originally not related to Pretty Cure, and was planned to be created as an original work on the theme of Halloween with Leff as the protagonist, but since the release of the Pretty Cure movie was on the day of Halloween, Takeshi Himi, who was in charge of production management, asked if it would be merged with that movie. Also, initially the story and Leff's appearance was different, but it later changed to its current form in Washio's opinion.

Hinata Uegaki was cast in the role of Leff. Uegaki had played a young Nala in the Shiki Theatre Company's production of The Lion King and was the winner of 's "Musical Kids NO.1 Ketteisen".Ryusei Nakao voices the antagonist Night Pumpkin.

In December of the same year Hiroshi Miyamoto was awarded the "1st CG WORLD Grand Prize" sponsored by CG WORLD magazine.

Music

The insert song of The Pumpkin Kingdom's Treasure is by Sharin' Miracle by Pumplulu (Kana Hanazawa), while the insert song of Leff's Wonder Night is Happy Happening♪ by Hinata Uegaki.

First single

Second single 

Sharin' Miracle/Happy Happening♪ is an insert song of the anime film Go! Princess Precure the Movie: Go! Go!! Splendid Triple Feature!!!. The single was released from Marvelous on October 28, 2015 The single topped at #114 in the Oricon Singles Chart on November 9, 2015.

Takaki described Sharin' Miracle as a "soft ballad" and Happy Happening♪ as a "lively, up-tempo song".

Track listing 
 Sharin' Miracle [4:50]
 Sung by: Pumplulu (Kana Hanazawa)
 Lyrics: Shoko Omori
 Work and Arrangement: Hiroshi Takagi
 Happy Happening♪ [3:51] 
 Sung by: Leff (Hinata Uegaki)
 Lyrics: Shoko Omori
 Work and Arrangement: Hiroshi Takagi
  [4:51]
  [3:48]

Soundtrack 

The film's original soundtrack was released on November 18, 2015. Hiroshi Takaki recorded the soundtrack. It topped at #271 in the Oricon Albums Chart on November 23, 2015.

Reception 
It was released on 211 screens nationwide, and in its first two days (October 31) and (November 1), 118,292 people attended the film and a revenue of ¥129,383,300 yen was recorded; this was the first time Kōgyō Tsūshin ranked a Pretty Cure film at fourth-place in film attendance. It ranked #2 in Pia's first-day satisfaction survey. Its final revenue was ¥560 million.

Home media and merchandise 
The film's DVD/BD was released on March 16, 2016. On March 28 the special-version DVD and regular-version DVD charted at 32 and 73 in the Oricon DVD Chart, while the BR charted at 19 in the Blu-ray Disc Chart.

A tie-in paperback book,  was released by Kodansha on March 15, 2017. Sakurako Akino said that she had talked to the person in charge of Kodansha's paperback division, a friend of her husband Keisuke Ishida, about a novelization of the film.

References

External links 
  
 

Japanese magical girl films
2015 anime films
Pretty Cure films
Japanese anthology films
2015 computer-animated films
Japanese films about Halloween
Films about princesses
Toei Animation films